The Drug Enforcement Administration Museum and Visitors Center is a museum owned by the Drug Enforcement Administration and located in Arlington County, Virginia. Its first exhibit, featuring exhibits of cannabis, coca, and poppy, opened in 1999.

The museum has appeared on a list of ten best sites published in USA Today. Fodor's calls its exhibits "hard hitting"; Lonely Planet's guide to Washington D.C. sarcastically recommended the museum, "If...you think all drug users and pushers should go to jail for a very long time and drugs and terrorism go hand in hand--or if you just have a thing for heavy-handed propaganda".

References

External links

1999 establishments in Virginia
Cannabis museums
Law enforcement museums in the United States
Medical museums in the United States
Museums established in 1999
Museums in Arlington County, Virginia